The  Minnie V  is a Chesapeake Bay skipjack, built in 1906 at Wenona, Maryland, United States. She is a 45.3-foot-long, two-sail bateau, or "V"-bottomed deadrise type of centerboard sloop. She has a beam of 15.7 feet and a depth of 3 feet with a net registered tonnage of 8 tons. She is one of the 35 surviving traditional Chesapeake Bay skipjacks and a member of the last commercial sailing fleet in the United States. She is located at Tilghman, Talbot County, Maryland.

The Minnie V is featured as the working skipjack in the television series Homicide: Life on the Street (third-season episode: "The Last of the Watermen").

She was listed on the National Register of Historic Places in 1985. She is assigned Maryland dredge number 50, was previously dredge 33.

References

External links
, including photo in 1983, at Maryland Historical Trust

Ships in Talbot County, Maryland
Skipjacks
Ships on the National Register of Historic Places in Maryland
1906 ships
National Register of Historic Places in Talbot County, Maryland